The men's decathlon event at the 1996 World Junior Championships in Athletics was held in Sydney, Australia, at International Athletic Centre on 21 and 22 August.  Senior implements (106.7 cm (3'6) hurdles, 7257g shot, 2 kg discus) were used.

Medalists

Results

Final
21/22 August

Participation
According to an unofficial count, 20 athletes from 15 countries participated in the event.

References

Decathlon
Combined events at the World Athletics U20 Championships